Cañada Viviancito, is a tributary arroyo of Alamosa Creek, and a side cañada in Monticello Canyon, in Sierra County, New Mexico. Its mouth is at its confluence with the creek at an elevation of  within Monticello Canyon.

References 

Valleys of New Mexico
Landforms of Sierra County, New Mexico
Rivers of Sierra County, New Mexico